A Father for Brittany (also known as A Change of Heart) is a 1998 American made-for-television drama film and based on a true story. Andrew McCarthy and Teri Polo play a husband and wife who try to adopt a child. The film originally premiered on CBS on March 15, 1998.

Plot
Keith Lussier, a hard-working man, and his wife Kim, a speech therapist, are high school sweethearts unable to conceive. The couple decides to adopt a baby, but Kim is more interested in the idea than Keith. Just before their baby girl arrives from Korea, Kim is diagnosed with uterine cancer. During her struggle to fight it, their new adopted daughter arrives. They name her Brittany. Keith's fears of becoming a father fade away as he gets to know his new daughter.

When Kim dies before the adoption is finalized, Keith loses Brittany because the adoption agency says they do not allow single parent adoptions. Keith goes to court to bring his daughter home and wins. Keith and Brittany are reunited.

References

External links

1998 television films
1998 films
1998 drama films
American films based on actual events
CBS network films
Films directed by Alan Metzger
American drama television films
1990s English-language films
1990s American films